Soul is the first studio album by Ravenhill. Slospeak Records released the album on March 24, 2015.

Critical reception

Awarding the album four stars from Jesus Freak Hideout, Scott Fryberger states, " It was a strong album then, and it's even better now." Scott Swan, rating the album four stars for Indie Vision Music, writes, "This record remarkably melds music from a by-gone era into something surprisingly invigorating. This music is real." Giving the album four and a half stars at Confront Magazine, Candra Miller says, "This whole album is great".

Track listing

References

2015 debut albums
Ravenhill (band) albums